Telegantic Megavision (in some billings written as "teleganticmegavision") is a British children's television programme produced by The Media Merchants for Meridian and aired on ITV from 6 January to 27 April 1996. The show was presented by Emma Lee and Dave Chapman and was recorded at The Maidstone Studios in Kent. The series aired between 9:25 and 10:25am on Saturday mornings. The show went behind scenes of film and television productions (such as Babylon 5), and also showed inserted cartoons from the in-studio 'animation station'. There was also a gameshow called Slops, presented by Nic Ayling and a roller-skating waitress called Cynthia Sundae, played by Lucy Benjamin, (later better known as Lisa Fowler in EastEnders.)

External links
 
 Telegantic Megavision on Paul Morris' SatKids

1996 British television series debuts
1996 British television series endings
1990s British children's television series
English-language television shows
ITV children's television shows
Television series by ITV Studios
Television shows produced by Meridian Broadcasting